Panamax and New Panamax (or Neopanamax) are terms for the size limits for ships travelling through the Panama Canal. The limits and requirements are published by the Panama Canal Authority (ACP) in a publication titled "Vessel Requirements". These requirements also describe topics like exceptional dry seasonal limits, propulsion, communications, and detailed ship design.

The allowable size is limited by the width and length of the available lock chambers, by the depth of water in the canal, and by the height of the Bridge of the Americas since that bridge's construction. These dimensions give clear parameters for ships destined to traverse the Panama Canal and have influenced the design of cargo ships, naval vessels, and passenger ships.

Panamax specifications have been in effect since the opening of the canal in 1914.  In 2009, the ACP published the New Panamax specification which came into effect when the canal's third set of locks, larger than the original two, opened on 26 June 2016. Ships that do not fall within the Panamax-sizes are called post-Panamax or super-Panamax.

The increasing prevalence of vessels of the maximum size is a problem for the canal, as a Panamax ship is a tight fit that requires precise control of the vessel in the locks, possibly resulting in longer lock time, and requiring that these ships transit in daylight. Because the largest ships traveling in opposite directions cannot pass safely within the Culebra Cut, the canal effectively operates an alternating one-way system for these ships.

Ship dimensions

The clearance under the Bridge of the Americas at Balboa is the limiting factor on a vessel's overall height for both Panamax and Neopanamax ships; the exact figure depends on the water level.

The maximum dimensions allowed for a ship transiting the canal using the original locks and the new locks (New Panamax) are:

Length
Overall (including protrusions): . Exceptions:

 Container ship and passenger ship: 
 Tug-barge combination, rigidly connected:  overall
 Other non-self-propelled vessels-tug combination:  overall;

Width (beam)
Width over outer surface of the shell plating: .

This was expanded to  during June 2018.

Draft
The name and definition of TFW is created by ACP using the freshwater Lake Gatún as a reference, since this is the determination of the maximum draft. The salinity and temperature of water affect its density, and hence how deep a ship will float in the water. The physical limit is set by the lower (seaside) entrance of the Pedro Miguel locks. When the water level in Lake Gatún is low during an exceptionally dry season the maximum permitted draft may be reduced. Such a restriction is published three weeks in advance, so ship loading plans can take appropriate measures.

Height
Vessel height is limited to  measured from the waterline to the vessel's highest point; the limit also pertains to New Panamax in order to pass under the Bridge of the Americas at Balboa harbor. Exception:  when passage at low water (MLWS) at Balboa is possible.

Cargo capacity
A Panamax cargo ship would typically have a DWT of 65,000–80,000 tonnes, but its maximum cargo would be about 52,500 tonnes during a transit due to draft limitations in the canal. New Panamax ships can carry 120,000 DWT.

Records

Routes
Major Panamax bulk trade routes include: Brazil to China, Australia to China, U.S. to China, China to China and Australia to India.

Expansion

As early as the 1930s, new locks were proposed for the Panama Canal to ease congestion and to allow larger ships to pass. The project was abandoned in 1942.

On October 22, 2006, the Panama Canal Authority (with the support of the Electoral Tribunal) held a referendum for Panamanian citizens to vote on the Panama Canal expansion project. The expansion was approved by a wide margin, with support from about 78% of voters. Construction began in 2007, and after several delays, the new locks opened for commercial traffic on 26 June 2016.

Neopanamax
Naval architects and civil engineers began taking into account these dimensions for container ships. The Neopanamax standard accommodates ships up to 120,000 DWT.

Impact on world ports

Several ports, including the ports of New York and New Jersey, Norfolk, and Baltimore, all on the East Coast of the United States, have already increased their depth to at least  to accommodate New Panamax ships; in 2015 the Port of Miami achieved the same in a project known as the "Deep Dredge"  and is the closest deep-water port to the Panama Canal in the US. Liverpool built a new container terminal, Liverpool2, where ships berth in the tidal river rather than in the enclosed docks, coinciding with the opening of the widened Panama Canal locks. In 2017, the Port Authority of New York and New Jersey raised the clearance of the Bayonne Bridge to 215 feet (66 m), at a cost of $1.7 billion, to allow New Panamax ships to reach container port facilities at Port Newark–Elizabeth Marine Terminal. Previously, only GCT Bayonne, Global Container, could handle the New Panamax ships.

As of April 2012, a controversy between Savannah, Georgia, and Charleston, South Carolina, over limited federal funding for dredging/deepening projects—including both state and federal lawsuits filed by environmental groups in both states opposing the techniques planned to be used in dredging the Savannah River—also revolves around attracting the business of carriers whose fleets include New Panamax vessels.

The American conservative think tanks Heritage Foundation and Cato Institute have cited the Foreign Dredge Act of 1906 as a factor in constraining American dredging capacity for expanding ports to accommodate post-Panamax ships.

Impact on existing ships

Due to the expansion, demand for 'Old Panamax' ships has plummeted, resulting in ships being traded at scrap value. Some ships only seven years old have been sold for scrap,  others have been widened.

Comparison of sizes

Post-Panamax and Post-Neopanamax ships
Post-Panamax or over-Panamax denote ships larger than Panamax that do not fit in the original canal locks, such as supertankers and the largest modern container and passenger ships. The first post-Panamax ship was the RMS Queen Mary, launched in 1934, built with a 118-foot beam as she was intended solely for North Atlantic passenger runs. When she was moved to Long Beach, California, as a tourist attraction in 1967, a lengthy voyage around Cape Horn was necessary. The first post-Panamax warships were the Japanese Yamato-class battleships, launched in 1940. Until World War II, the United States Navy required that all of their warships be capable of transiting the Panama Canal. The limit was specifically removed by the Secretary of the Navy on 12 February 1940, with the (never-realized) prospect of a new set of 140-foot wide locks to be built for the Canal. The s were designed with a folding deck-edge elevator to meet Panamax limits; the limit did not apply to subsequent US aircraft carriers.

See also 

 Cargo ship sizes Handymax, Panamax, Suezmax, Capesize
 List of Panamax ports

References

External links
 Tanker ships
 Ship sizes 
 Panamax and New Panamax 

Panama Canal
Ship measurements
Ship types